The Aldrich–Genella House is a historic house located at 4801 St. Charles Avenue in New Orleans, Louisiana.

Description and history 
The -story house was built in 1866 and was designed by Thomas Brown Wright in the Second Empire style of architecture, which was nationally popular at the time. In 1878, it was renovated and fitted with elements of the Renaissance Revival style. It was added to the National Register of Historic Places on October 8, 1980.

References

Houses on the National Register of Historic Places in Louisiana
Second Empire architecture in Louisiana
Renaissance Revival architecture in Louisiana
Houses completed in 1866
Houses in New Orleans
1866 establishments in Louisiana
National Register of Historic Places in New Orleans